A New Day... was the first concert residency performed by Canadian singer Celine Dion in The Colosseum at Caesars Palace in Las Vegas, Nevada, United States. It was created and directed by Franco Dragone to support her seventh English-language and eighteenth studio album A New Day Has Come (2002). The show premiered on 25 March 2003 and ended on 15 December 2007. 

A 90-minute event, A New Day... introduced a new form of theatrical entertainment, a fusion of song, performance art, innovative stage craft and state-of-the-art technology.

The residency was originally planned for three years (Dion received about $100 million, plus 50 percent of the profits during the three-year contract). However due to its immediate success, the show continued for an additional two years. It is the most successful residency of all time, grossing over US$385 million ($ million in  dollars) and drawing nearly three million people to 717 shows.

Dion returned to Las Vegas on 15 March 2011 to perform her second residency, Celine.

Background and creation

Dion initially intended for the show to be named Muse, but the band of the same name owned worldwide performing rights. Dion offered $50,000 for the rights, but the band declined, with lead singer Matthew Bellamy explaining that he did not want people to think they were Celine Dion's backup act.

The original plan for the stage backdrop/scenery was to simply use a giant video projector, but when the lighting designer, Yves Aucoin, pointed out that this would create unacceptable shadows when dancers ran in front of it, Angelil went back to Phil Anschutz, whose AEG Live was underwriting the production, and persuaded him to contribute an extra $10 million for the construction of the largest indoor LED screen in North America. The LED screen was produced by Mitsubishi Diamond Vision LED Screens. This was an HDTV LED Screen Installation with an 8mm Display "Dot Pitch". The screen consisted of many separate LED panels put together.

Critical reception

The year the show opened, A New Day... received mostly mixed reviews in the press, commenting on how there was not enough of a balance between concert and theater.  In TheaterMania.com, an article by Christine Westley praised the sets but wrote that Dion's performance was "inconsequential at best...  The most uncomfortable moments come when the music stops, the dancers disappear, and it's just Dion and her audience. This is when the show's split personality truly emerges: Dragone's alternate world is gone and now we have a Celine Dion concert, during which the star attempts witty banter as her fans scream out the mandatory declarations "We love you, Celine!" and then hold their breath, waiting for her to stop talking and start singing again."

Phil Gallo of Variety praised the sets like the former article, but criticized choices in covers.  He stated, "Her run through a nostalgic trio — Etta James' first hit, 'At Last,' Peggy Lee's version of 'Fever' and the Frank Sinatra-phrased 'I've Got the World on a String' — magnified her lack of soulfulness, but they did display her capacity for mimicry: She phrases everything exactly as her predecessors did.  For 'First Time Ever I Saw Your Face,' it appeared Dion and her musical director Claude (Mego) Lemay had the softness of Roberta Flack's original in mind. But they then go out on a bizarre limb, progressively bloating the arrangement and her vocal interpretation. Worse yet, Dion ascends 70 feet into the heavens with dancers all around her. Nice effect, but another song would be more appropriate for it....  It's conceivable that future audiences will have more rapport with Dion and her music than opening night's high rollers and invited guests. Dion never looked like she was struggling, but if she didn't ask for audience participation, she wasn't going to get any anyway."

In the documentary, A New Day... The Secrets, included as a bonus in the Live in Las Vegas: A New Day..., Dion and Dragone commented on making changes to the show through the years to include more appearances of the band members, or to change Dion's look to make it more like what fans expected.

The year when A New Day... was going to close, Mike Weatherford of Las Vegas Review-Journal wrote a positive review.  He stated how Dion "...grew into 'A New Day' over the years, and for better or worse the show evolved into more of the diva showcase people expected at the outset: an upscale pop show with some artsy flourishes, not the swing-for-the fences collaboration with Cirque du Soleil director Franco Dragone that often tried too hard.  Some early mistakes disappeared quickly. It's been a long time since Dion flew on a harness rigging, or dressed up like the "Pat" character on 'Saturday Night Live,' with slicked-back hair and hitched-up, man-boy suspenders.  Other changes replaced the audacious with safe and sure-footed, but more ordinary choices. The show now opens with—wouldya believe it? -- the title song 'A New Day' instead of the solitary, a capella take on "Nature Boy." The standards "Fever" and "At Last" were replaced in May 2006 with a now-common tech trick, splicing in Frank Sinatra to help croon 'All the Way.'  And the homestretch now celebrates the cast as a bonded unit with the Ike & Tina Turner classic 'River Deep—Mountain High.' Dragone would have found it cheesy back in '03. Now, he probably realizes the show needed an energy that had been stifled in its overproduced infancy.  The world's largest hi-def screen no longer steals the show as it did before Best Buy shoppers knew the difference between a 720p and 1080p TV. But Dragone's elegant spectacle still makes the jaw drop now and then."

Broadcasts and recordings

The show was first filmed to serve as a TV Special for the opening night. However, Celine in Las Vegas, Opening Night Live included only 8 songs.

In autumn 2003 (26-30 November 2003), the show was filmed again and a DVD was scheduled to be released in autumn 2004. Firstly, in June 2004, a CD entitled A New Day... Live in Las Vegas (featuring 13 live songs) was released and included promotional information that a DVD was going to be released in autumn. This release was cancelled with no plans to release it in the future. However, this DVD was shown to the audience during one of the shows when Celine was sick and couldn't perform. 

Reportedly, another DVD was recorded between 2005 and 2006 with Celine having long brown hair and new costumes as many different extracts have appeared. 

Finally, A New Day... was re-shot in high-definition during the 17–21 January 2007 week and released on DVD on 7 December 2007 and on Blu-ray Disc on 5 February 2008. The DVD represents the show as of January 2007.The two disc set, which contains more than 5 hours of never-before seen footage, including the concert and three exclusive documentaries: Because You Loved Me (A Tribute to the Fans), A New Day: All Access and A New Day: the Secrets, became very successful on the music DVD charts around the world.

According to the Quebec press, Live in Las Vegas - A New Day ... was completely sold-out in the province less than a few hours after its release. In addition, Dion made history on 18 January 2008 when Live in Las Vegas - A New Day ... became the only music DVD to be certified triple diamond in Canada, selling over 300,000 units. Only five other DVDs have ever reached double diamond status in Canada. Dion's DVD also garnered the largest debut in Nielsen SoundScan history for a DVD-only release, with over 70,000 copies sold in its first week, which is something that has never occurred before in Canadian music history. Live in Las Vegas - A New Day ... held the number 1 position on the Music DVD Chart in Canada for many weeks after its release.
Outside Canada, the DVD peaked at number 1 in the United States, United Kingdom, France, Japan, Netherlands, Belgium, Denmark, New Zealand and Estonia. It reached number 2 in Portugal and Sweden, number 3 in Argentina, Australia, Ireland and Greece, number 4 in Austria, number 6 in Italy and number 7 in Czech Republic. Live in Las Vegas - A New Day ... also debuted in the top 10 in Finland and Germany.
Nearly 500,000 copies of the DVD were sold worldwide in its first week of release. Live in Las Vegas - A New Day ... was certified 3× diamond in Canada, diamond in France, 4× platinum in Australia, platinum in Brazil, Portugal, Argentina and New Zealand, and gold in the Netherlands and Belgium. In Japan, it sold 30,000 copies during the first three months of its release. As of 26 September 2010, the DVD has sold 433,000 copies in the U.S. and has been certified 7× platinum (it is now eligible for 8× platinum after selling 400,000 copies).[16] According to Billboard, the DVD was the third best-selling music DVD of 2008 in the U.S. and the best-selling by a female artist.[17] At the end of 2009, the DVD was still charting in the top 10, being the tenth best-selling DVD in the U.S.

Even though the official DVD contains many extras, a lot of songs which were performed throughout the years have not been included:

"Nature Boy," "At Last," "Fever," "The First Time Ever I Saw Your Face", "Et je t'aime encore," "Have You Ever Been in Love", "Happy Xmas (War Is Over)", "God Bless America", "In Some Small Way",  "What a Wonderful World", "Can't Help Falling In Love", "Taking Chances" and "The Christmas Song".

In addition, two instrumentals: "A New Love" and "Aria Di Lucia De Lammermoor" have been omitted as well.

Audio versions of "Nature Boy", "At Last," "Fever" "Et je t'aime encore" and "What a Wonderful World" were included on the A New Day... Live in Las Vegas CD, released in June 2004

Various songs (both from the usual setlist and one-night only performances) have been broadcast during different TV programmes, promotional videos, etc.

Shows

Boxscore 
Pollstar's "Top 100 Tours 2003": #2
Total Gross: US$80.5 million
Total Attendance: 593,120
No. of shows: 146

Pollstar's "Top 100 Tours 2004": #2
Total Gross: US$80.4 million
Total Attendance: 589,494
No. of shows: 146

Pollstar's "Top 100 Tours 2005": #3
Total Gross: US$81.3 million
Total Attendance: 597,632
No. of shows: 155

Pollstar's "Top 100 Tours 2006": #6
Total Gross: US$78.1 million
Total Attendance: 577,095
No. of shows: 147

Pollstar's "Top 100 Tours 2007": #4
Total Gross: US$65.3 million
Total Attendance: 462,616
No. of shows: 126

Total 
Total Gross: US$400 million
Total Attendance: 2,819,957
No. of shows: 720

Personnel
Director: Franco Dragone
Associate Director: Pavel Brun
Musical Director: Claude (Mego) Lemay
Artistic Director: Brian Burke
Set Designer and Image Creator: Michel Crête
Lighting Designer: Yves (Lapin) Aucoin
Sound Designer: Denis Savage
Projection Content Designer: Dirk Decloedt
Costume Design: Annie Horth, Dominique Lemieux, Seble Maaza, Richard Ruiz
Choreographer: Mia Michaels
White Character: Elijah Brown
Dance Captains: Deon Ridley, Tina Cannon, Lavert Benefield, Andrea Ziegler

Band
Conductor and Piano: Claude (Mego) Lemay
Violin: Jean-Sébastien Carré
Guitars: André Coutu
Percussion: Paul Picard (till 2006), Nannette Fortier (joined in 2007)
Keyboards: Yves Frulla
Bass: Marc Langis
Drums: Dominique Messier
Cello: Julie McInnes
Background Vocals, Cello and Tin Whistle: Élise Duguay
Background Vocals: Mary-Lou Gauthier, Barnev Valsaint

Awards

References

Concert residencies in the Las Vegas Valley
Celine Dion concert residencies
2003 concert residencies
2004 concert residencies
2005 concert residencies
2006 concert residencies
2007 concert residencies
Caesars Palace